Sowmeeh or Sowmaeh or Sumaeh or Sumeeh or Sowmaah may refer to:
 Sowmaeh, Ardabil, Ardabil Province
 Sowmeeh, Ahar, East Azerbaijan Province
 Sowmaeh, Ajab Shir, East Azerbaijan Province
 Sowmaeh, Charuymaq, East Azerbaijan Province
 Sowmaeh, Hashtrud, East Azerbaijan Province
 Sowmaeh, Heris, East Azerbaijan Province
 Sowmaeh, Kaleybar, East Azerbaijan Province
 Sowmeeh, Maragheh, East Azerbaijan Province
 Sowmaeh Del, East Azerbaijan Province
 Sowmaeh-ye Olya, Maragheh, East Azerbaijan Province
 Sowmaeh-ye Sofla, Maragheh, East Azerbaijan Province
 Sowmaeh-ye Olya, Meyaneh, East Azerbaijan Province
 Sowmaeh-ye Sofla, Meyaneh, East Azerbaijan Province
 Sowmaeh Zarrin, Mehraban, East Azerbaijan Province
 Sowmaeh Zarrin, Sarab, East Azerbaijan Province
 Sowmeeh-ye Bozorg, Razavi Khorasan Province
 Sowmeeh-ye Kuchak, Razavi Khorasan Province
 Sowmeeh, Mazul, Razavi Khorasan Province
 Sowmeeh, Rivand, Razavi Khorasan Province
 Sowmeeh, Torbat-e Heydarieh, Razavi Khorasan Province

See also
 Sowme'eh Sara
 Sowme'eh Sara County
 Sowmeeh-ye Rudbar